The NZWPW Heavyweight Championship was the top professional wrestling championship title in the New Zealand promotion New Zealand Wide Pro Wrestling (NZWPW). It was the original super heavyweight title of Wellington Pro Wrestling and introduced as the WPW Super Heavyweight Championship on 3 December 2004. The inaugural champion was Ruamoko, who defeated Les Barrett in a tournament final in Lower Hutt, New Zealand on 25 April 1992. The title became vacant when Ruamoko suffered an injury in early-2005 and, after the promotion became New Zealand Wide Pro Wrestling, it was replaced by the NZWPW Heavyweight Championship first won by Island Boy Si on 25 March 2005.

The final champion under the NZWPW banner was Bryant who was in his first reign. On 17 November 2018, at Capital Pro Wrestling's MitchellMania event, the title was deactivated when NZWPW owner Martin Stirling was seen taking the NZWPW Heavyweight Championship from the then current champion Bryant. In February 2020, the NZWPW promotion was closed as Stirling retired.

On 28 May 2022, the championship was reinstated in the Hughes Academy promotion by guest host Ben Mana. Axl Stirling defeated Kartik and "The Spartan" Sam Black to win the vacant title belt.

Title history

List of combined reigns

References

External links
New Zealand Wide Pro Wrestling's official title history page

Heavyweight wrestling championships
Regional professional wrestling championships
Professional wrestling in New Zealand